Mary Virginia Weber (October 22, 1927 – January 8, 2017) was an American politician who served in the New Jersey General Assembly from the 4th Legislative District from 1992 to 1994. In addition to serving a single term there, she was a member of the Washington Township Council and a Gloucester County Freeholder. Prior to becoming an elected official, Weber was a kindergarten teacher in Claymont, Delaware.

References

1927 births
2017 deaths
Politicians from Gloucester County, New Jersey
Women state legislators in New Jersey
New Jersey city council members
County commissioners in New Jersey
Republican Party members of the New Jersey General Assembly
People from Washington Township, Gloucester County, New Jersey
Women city councillors in New Jersey
21st-century American women